When speciation is not driven by (or strongly correlated with) divergent natural selection, it can be said to be nonecological, so as to distinguish it from the typical definition of ecological speciation: "It is useful to consider ecological speciation as its own form of species formation because it focuses on an explicit mechanism of speciation: namely divergent natural selection. There are numerous ways other than via divergent natural selection in which populations might become genetically differentiated and reproductively isolated." It is likely that many instances of nonecological speciation are allopatric, especially when the organisms in question are poor dispersers (e.g., land snails, salamanders), however sympatric nonecological speciation may also be possible, especially when accompanied by an "instant" (at least in evolutionary time) loss of reproductive compatibility, as when polyploidization happens. Other potential mechanisms for nonecological speciation include mutation-order speciation and  changes in chirality in gastropods.

Nonecological speciation might not be accompanied by strong morphological differentiation, so might give rise to cryptic species, however there are some species that are difficult for humans to differentiate that are strongly differentiated with respect to their resource use, and so are likely a result of ecological speciation (e.g., host shifts in parasites or phytophagous insects). When species recognition/sexual selection plays a strong role in maintaining species boundaries, the species generated by nonecological speciation might be straightforward for humans to differentiate, as in some odonates.

See also 
 Nonadaptive radiation

References 

Ecology
Evolutionary biology